E tū is a New Zealand trade union created in October 2015 through the merger of the Service & Food Workers Union, the Flight Attendants and Related Services Union, and the Engineering, Printing and Manufacturing Union. It represents more than 50,000 workers.

References 

Trade unions in New Zealand
New Zealand Council of Trade Unions
Manufacturing trade unions
Trade unions established in 2015